Frederick Kovert (sometimes written Ko Vert or KoVert) was an American female impersonator. Kovert appeared in drag in a number of comic roles in silent films of the 1920s. His first film role was in the 1920 film An Adventuress, alongside Julian Eltinge, then the best-known female impersonator in the entertainment world. Kovert appeared in the 1925 The Wizard of Oz, a silent film adaptation of L. Frank Baum's The Wonderful Wizard of Oz, and also designed the film's costumes.

Following the end of his career in film, Kovert became a physique photographer, operating under the name Kovert of Hollywood. Bob Mizer, who would go on to pioneer the physique magazine format with his Physique Pictorial, apprenticed under Kovert in the 1940s. Kovert's nude photography business made him a target for the Los Angeles Police Department vice squad, and in 1945 his studio was raided and he pled guilty to possession of obscene materials.

Kovert died in 1949 by a self-inflicted gunshot wound.

Filmography

References

External links

Physique photography
American male silent film actors
20th-century American male actors
American drag queens
1949 deaths
Suicides by firearm in California